Elnigar Iltebir (born 1984) is a United States-based Uyghur politician and activist. The Trump administration appointed her as Director for China in the United States National Security Council in August 2019.

Personal life
Elnigar Iltebir was born in Ürümqi, Xinjiang in 1984. In 1992, she moved to Istanbul, Turkey with her family and lived there until she completed her high school education in Kabataş Erkek Lisesi. In February 2000, her family moved to the United States.

Iltebir is the daughter of Ablikim Baqi Iltebir, who is a well-known Uyghur writer and journalist. The elder Iltebir worked as a middle school teacher, was the chief editor in "Tengritagh Journal" and vice-president of "Urumchi Art Union" in Urumchi, and worked for Radio Free Asia from February 2000 to August 2017. Ablikim Baqi Iltebir died on August 8, 2019 at the age of 68.

Education
University of Maryland, College Park
Doctor of Philosophy (Ph.D.), International Security and Economic Policy

2009-2015

Harvard Kennedy School
MPP, International Security and Political Economy

2005-2007

The George Washington University
B.A., International Relations

2001-2005

See also
Uyghur Americans
United States National Security Council

References

Living people
Uyghurs
1984 births
Elliott School of International Affairs alumni
University of Maryland, College Park alumni
Harvard Kennedy School alumni
People from Ürümqi